Sterphus chiragra is a species of Hoverfly in the family Syrphidae.

Distribution
South America.

References

Eristalinae
Insects described in 1805
Diptera of South America
Taxa named by Johan Christian Fabricius